The Invasion of Muscovy occurred in the year 1521, the invasion was led by Mehmed I Giray of the Crimean Khanate, a vassal of the Ottoman Empire.

Background
In 1521 the Khan of the Crimean Khanate, Mehmed I Giray, prepared a great invasion of Russia. The ruler of Kazan was despised by his people and Mehmed Giray took advantage of this, he seized the city and appointed his brother as its ruler. Having seized Kazan Mehmed Giray collected a great force and began his advance towards Muscovy.

Battle
He met Vasili at the banks of the Oka river and crushed the Russian army. Mehmeds brother Shihab Giray joined him at Kolomna massacring people and desecrating churches as he advanced. The monastery of St Nicholas was burnt as well as the village of Ostrof which was Vasili's favourite residence. The Crimean Tatars, now drunken off the hydromel in Vasili's cellars, overlooked Moscow. Vasili reportedly humiliated himself, he was forced to pay tribute and made to sign a treaty formalising his status as dependent on and a tributary of the Crimean Khanate. The Tatar general reportedly built his own statue in Moscow and made Vasili prostrate before it.

Aftermath
Following the submission of Vasilli, Mehmed Giray withdrew, reportedly in 1523 after news of an offensive against Crimea by the Astrakhan Khanate. During his withdrawal Mehmed was attacked by the cannonballs of the governor of Riazan who took the humiliating treaty from him, however 30,000 prisoners were taken to Kaffa and sold to the Turks.

References

Battles involving Russia
Battles involving the Ottoman Empire
Wars involving Russia
Crimean Khanate